Moldovan alphabet may refer to:
 Moldovan Cyrillic alphabet
 Romanian alphabet